The 1979–80 Allsvenskan was the 46th season of the top division of Swedish handball. 12 teams competed in the league. HK Drott won the regular season, but Lugi HF won the playoffs and claimed their first Swedish title. IF Guif and AIK were relegated.

League table

Playoffs

Semifinals
LUGI–HK Drott 15–18, 22–18, 24–22 (LUGI advance to the finals)
Ystads IF–IK Heim 24–25, 24–22, 20–17 (Ystads IF advance to the finals)

Finals
LUGI–Ystads IF 18–19, 20–19, 19–17 a.e.t. (LUGI champions)

References 

Swedish handball competitions